Temple Emanuel is a Reform synagogue in Beverly Hills, California.

Location
It is located at 300 N Clark Drive in Beverly Hills, California.

History
The synagogue was founded in 1938. The first rabbi, Ernest Trattner, served until 1947, when he left amid dissension among the congregation, culminating in litigation.

The current building, completed in 1953, was the first religious building designed by architect Sidney Eisenshtat, who went on to become a noted designer of synagogues and Jewish academic buildings.  Built with red brick and concrete, it is considered an important example of modernist synagogue architecture.

Inside, the Belle Chapel presents a permanent memorial to the victims of the Holocaust. The sculpture inside the chapel was designed by Dr Eric May and donated by Nicolai Joffe.

Isaiah Zeldin served as one of its rabbis from 1958 until he left to found Stephen S. Wise Temple in Bel Air in 1964.  Rabbi Zeldin was preceded by Bernard Harrison; after Rabbi Harrison's death, a chapel was dedicated in his honor. Edward Krawll was cantor for many years. Meanwhile, comedian Groucho Marx was a congregant.

By 1993, the synagogue had a US$2-million debt. One of the proposed solutions was to merge with the Wilshire Boulevard Temple, a large Reform synagogue located at Western and Vermont avenues in Koreatown. However, Temple Emanuel's congregation narrowly voted to reject the merger, deciding that it would change the traditional culture of the synagogue too much. Finances were stabilized by donations, and a capital campaign eventually yielded some $10 million.  The building underwent a substantial renovation in 2011, under the supervision of Rios Clementi Hale Studios.

At present
From 1994–2015, Laura Geller had served as senior rabbi. This made her the first female rabbi to lead a major metropolitan congregation. Rabbi Jonathan Aaron has served as senior rabbi since 2015. The clergy team who work alongside Rabbi Aaron are Rabbi Sarah Bassin (Associate Rabbi), Rabbi Adam Lutz (Assistant Rabbi/Director of Education), and Cantor Lizzie Weiss.

In 2019, the School and community building, across the street, was sold to a developer. In 2021, the School and community building was demolished for a future apartment or Condominium project.

References

1938 establishments in California
Synagogues in Beverly Hills, California
Reform synagogues in California
Synagogues completed in 1953
Jewish organizations established in 1938